Mahulena (pronounced mah-huw-leh-nah) is a female given name of Czech origin. The Slovak variant is Mahuliena (pronounced mah-huw-LI-ye-nah). The name days are 17 November (Czech) and 22 July (Slovak).

Mahulena may also refer to:

Mahulena Bočanová, Czech actress
Mahulena Nešlehová, Czech painter's theorist and curator
Mahulena Richterová, doctor of medicine

Fictional works 
Mahuliena, Golden Maiden, Slovak-German fairy-tale from 1986
Radúz and Mahulena, the dramatic poem by Julius Zeyer

See also
List of articles beginning with "Mahulena"

External links 
Mahulena -> Behind the Name
We named with...?

Czech feminine given names
Slovak feminine given names